The Three Chimneys is a  mountain summit located in Tuolumne County, California, United States.

Description
The Three Chimneys is set on the boundary of the Emigrant Wilderness on land managed by Stanislaus National Forest. The landform is part of the Sierra Nevada mountain range and is situated four miles northwest of Granite Dome. Precipitation runoff from this mountain drains into tributaries of the Stanislaus River. The landform's descriptive toponym has been officially adopted by the U.S. Board on Geographic Names.

Climate
According to the Köppen climate classification system, Three Chimneys is located in an alpine climate zone. Most weather fronts originate in the Pacific Ocean, and travel east toward the Sierra Nevada mountains. As fronts approach, they are forced upward by the peaks (orographic lift), causing moisture in the form of rain or snowfall to drop onto the range.

Gallery

References

External links
 Weather forecast: The Three Chimneys
 The Three Chimneys (photo): Flickr
 

Mountains of Tuolumne County, California
North American 3000 m summits
Mountains of Northern California
Sierra Nevada (United States)
Stanislaus National Forest